Roger Friedrich Nikolaus Beckamp (born 18 July 1975) is a German politician from the AfD. He has been a Member of the German Bundestag from North Rhine-Westphalia since 2021.

Early life 
Beckhamp was born in Cologne.

Political career 
Beckhamp sat in the Landtag of North Rhine-Westphalia.

In the 2021 German federal election, he contested the constituency of Rhein-Sieg-Kreis II but came in fifth place. He was elected via the state list.

References

See also 

 List of members of the 20th Bundestag

Living people
1975 births
Members of the Bundestag for North Rhine-Westphalia
21st-century German politicians
Members of the Bundestag 2021–2025
Members of the Bundestag for the Alternative for Germany
Members of the Landtag of North Rhine-Westphalia
Politicians from Cologne
People from Rhein-Sieg-Kreis